Calumma capuroni is a species of chameleon, a lizard in the family Chamaeleonidae. The species is endemic to Madagascar.

Etymology
The specific name, capuroni is in honor of French botanist René Paul Raymond Capuron.

Habitat

Reproduction
C. capuroni is oviparous.

References

Further reading
Brygoo E-R, Blanc C, Domergue C (1972). "Notes sur les Chamaeleo de Madagascar. X. Deux nouveaux Caméléons des hauts sommets de Madagscar: C. capuroni n.sp. et C. gastrotaenia andringitraensis n.subsp." Bulletin du Muséum d'Histoire Naturelle, Paris, Série 3, 56 (42): 601–613. (Chameleo capuroni, new species, p. 601). (in French).
Glaw F, Vences M (2006). A Field Guide to the Amphibians and Reptiles of Madagascar, Third Edition. Cologne, Germany: Vences & Glaw Verlag. 496 pp. . 
Klaver CJ, Böhme W (1986). "Phylogeny and classification of the Chamaeleonidae (Sauria) with special reference to hemipenis morphology". Bonner Zoologische Monographien 22: 1–64. (Calumma capuroni, new combination).

Calumma
Reptiles of Madagascar
Reptiles described in 1972
Taxa named by Édouard-Raoul Brygoo
Taxa named by Charles Pierre Blanc
Taxa named by Charles Domergue